Escape Route or Escape Routes may refer to:

Escape Route (film), a 1952 British film
"Escape Route", a 1982 song composed for First Blood
Escape Routes, a 1997 book by David Roberts (climber)
"Escape Route", a 1998 short story by Peter F. Hamilton
Escape Route, a 2009 album by Joe Budden
Escape Routes (TV series), a 2012 American television series
"Escape Route" (song), a 2013 song by Paramore
Escape Routes, a 2016 book by Johann Christoph Arnold
Escape Routes (book), a 2020 book by Naomi Ishiguro

See also
Emergency exit
Evacuation route
Runaway truck ramp
Underground Railroad